Stephen McConaghy (born 15 January 1968) is a sailor from Sydney, Australia. who represented his country at the 1996 Summer Olympics in Savannah, United States as crew member in the Soling. With helmsman Matt Hayes and fellow crew member Steve Jarvin they took the 12th place.

References

External links
 
 
 
 

1968 births
Living people
Australian male sailors (sport)
Olympic sailors of Australia
Sailors at the 1996 Summer Olympics – Soling
World champions in sailing for Australia
Farr 30 class world champions
Sailors from Sydney
20th-century Australian people